The HARP Academy of Health Science is a four-year public high school in Paterson in Passaic County, New Jersey, United States, operated as part of the Paterson Public Schools. It is one of a number of academy programs serving students in ninth through twelfth grades offered by the school district.

As of the 2021–22 school year, the school had an enrollment of 291 students and 27.0 classroom teachers (on an FTE basis), for a student–teacher ratio of 10.8:1. There were 164 students (56.4% of enrollment) eligible for free lunch and none eligible for reduced-cost lunch.

History
Starting in the 2021-22 school year, HARP Academy moved to the former Paterson Catholic High School facility, relocating from a downtown building it had occupied since 2016.

Awards, recognition and rankings
The school was the 219th-ranked public high school in New Jersey out of 339 schools statewide in New Jersey Monthly magazine's September 2014 cover story on the state's "Top Public High Schools", using a new ranking methodology.

In February 2016, HARP Academy was named one of New Jersey's Rewards School for High Performance, the only school in the county to be recognized for the award. The school received a one time grant in the amount of $50,000 to be used to enhance the school's existing Title I program.

Administration
The school's principal is Kelli A. White.

References

External links 
School website
Paterson Public Schools

School Data for the Paterson Public Schools, National Center for Education Statistics

Education in Paterson, New Jersey
Public high schools in Passaic County, New Jersey